Garry Disher (born 15 August 1949, in Corporate Town of Burra, South Australia) is an Australian author of crime fiction and children's literature.

Awards 

The Canberra Times National Short Story Competition, 1986: winner for "Amateur Hour"
Children's Book Council of Australia Book of the Year Award, Book of the Year: Younger Readers, 1993: winner for The Bamboo Flute
IBBY Honour Diploma, Writing, 1994 for The Bamboo Flute
NBC Banjo Awards, NBC Banjo Award for Fiction, 1996: shortlisted for The Sunken Road 
New South Wales Premier's Literary Awards, Ethnic Affairs Commission Award, 1999: shortlisted for The Divine Wind  
Children's Book Council of Australia Book of the Year Award, Book of the Year: Older Readers, 1999: shortlisted for The Divine Wind 
New South Wales Premier's Literary Awards, The Ethel Turner Prize for Young People's Literature, 1999: winner for The Divine Wind 
Deutscher Krimi Preis (German Crime Fiction Award), International, 2000: winner for Kickback  
Deutscher Krimi Preis (German Crime Fiction Award), International, 2002: winner for The Dragon Man 
Ned Kelly Awards for Crime Writing, Best Novel, 2007: winner for Chain of Evidence 
Ned Kelly Awards for Crime Writing, Best Novel, 2010: winner for Wyatt
Deutscher Krimi Preis (German Crime Fiction Award), International, 2017: winner for Bitter Wash Road
Ned Kelly Awards Lifetime Achievement Award, 2018
Colin Roderick Award, 2020: shortlisted for Peace
Colin Roderick Award, 2021: shortlisted for Consolation

Bibliography

Novels 
Steal Away (1987)
The Stencil Man (1988)
The Sunken Road (1996)
Past the Headlands (2001)
Play Abandoned (2011)
Under the Cold Bright Lights (2017)
Her (2017)
The Way It Is Now (2021)

Crime series – The Wyatt novels 
Kickback (1991)
Paydirt (1992)
Deathdeal (1993)
Crosskill (1994)
Port Vila Blues (1996)
The Fallout (1997)
Wyatt (2010)
The Wyatt Butterfly (2010: omnibus containing Port Vila Blues and The Fallout)
The Heat (2015)
Kill Shot (2018)

Crime series – The Challis and Destry novels 
The Dragon Man (1999)
Kittyhawk Down (2003)
Snapshot (2005)
Chain of Evidence (2007)
Blood Moon (2009)
Whispering Death (2012)
Signal Loss (2016)

Crime series – The Paul Hirschhausen novels 
Bitter Wash Road (2013) published in 2014 as Hell to Pay  in the US
Peace (2019) published by Text Publishing
Consolation (2020) published by Text Publishing
Day's End (2022) published by Text Publishing

Short story collections 
Approaches (1981)
The Difference to Me (1988)
Flamingo Gate (1991)
Straight, Bent and Barbara Vine (crime stories, 1997)

Young adult 
Blame the Wind (1995)
Restless : Stories of Flight & Fear (1995)
The Half Dead (1997)
The Apostle Bird (1997)
The Divine Wind (1999)
From Your Friend, Louis Deane (2000)
Moondyne Kate (2001)
Eva's Angel (2003)
Two-Way Cut (2004)

Children's 
The Bamboo Flute (1992)
Ratface (1993)
Ermyntrude Takes Charge (1995)
Walk Twenty, Run Twenty (1996)
Maddie Finn (2002)
Switch Cat (1994)

Edited 
The Man Who Played Spoons (1987)
Personal Best (1989)
Personal Best 2 (1991)
Below the Waterline (1999)

Non-fiction 
Wretches and Rebels: The Australian Bushrangers (1981)
Writing Fiction: An Introduction to the Craft (1983)
Bushrangers (1984)
Total War: The Home Front, 1939-1945 (1985)
Australia Then & Now (1987)
Writing Professionally: The Freelancer's Guide to Writing and Marketing (1989)
Writing Fiction: An Introduction to the Craft (revised edition) (2001)

Critical studies and reviews of Disher's work
Consolaton

References

External links 
Garry Disher's website

Living people
20th-century Australian novelists
20th-century Australian male writers
21st-century Australian novelists
Australian children's writers
Australian crime writers
Australian crime fiction writers
Australian male novelists
Australian non-fiction writers
Australian male short story writers
Ned Kelly Award winners
People from Burra, South Australia
20th-century Australian short story writers
21st-century Australian short story writers
21st-century Australian male writers
1949 births
Male non-fiction writers